Bangkok Expressway and Metro Public Company Limited or BEM is a state enterprise under the Ministry of Transport of Thailand. It operates two metro lines in Bangkok and expressways. 

It was formed by the merger of Bangkok Expressway Public Company Limited (“BECL”) and Bangkok Metro Public Company Limited (“BMCL”) on December 30, 2015.

Under 25-year concession agreements with the Mass Rapid Transit Authority of Thailand, BEM operates the MRT Blue Line and MRT Purple Line. Additional BEM has won contracts to build or operate three expressways in Bangkok: the Si Rat expressway, Si Rat - Outer Ring Road Expressway and Udon Ratthaya Expressway.

BEM is listed on the Stock Exchange of Thailand and has a market value over THB 80,000 million.

References

External links 
 Official website 
Rail transport in Bangkok
Companies listed on the Stock Exchange of Thailand
Transport companies of Thailand